The Nanxiong Formation (also known as Yuanpu Formation) is a Late Cretaceous geologic formation in Guangdong Province. Dinosaur remains are among the fossils that have been recovered from the formation.

Description 
It consists of continental siliciclastic red beds, with fauna which similar to that of the Nemegt Formation. It has been dated about 66.7 ± 0.3 million years ago. It is the lowest unit of the Nanxiong Basin, a small graben created during Mesozoic rifting. Buck et al. state that it overlies Jurassic granite basement, and is conformably overlain by the Shanghu Formation. Alternative stratigraphic schemes for the Nanxiong basin have been proposed, one of which refers to the Nanxiong succession as the Nanxiong Group, and dividing it into the Yuanfu, Zhutian and Zhenshui formations, and overlying the Albian to Turonian Changba Formation.

Paleobiota of the Nanxiong Formation

Crocodilians

Lizards

Turtles

Dinosaurs

Hadrosaurs

Oviraptorosaurs

Sauropods

Therizinosaurids

Tyrannosaurids

See also 
 List of dinosaur-bearing rock formations
 Dalangshan Formation

References 

Geologic formations of China
Upper Cretaceous Series of Asia
Cretaceous China
Campanian Stage
Maastrichtian Stage
Sandstone formations
Ooliferous formations
Fossiliferous stratigraphic units of Asia
Paleontology in Guangdong